The women's 4 × 400 metres relay at the 2016 European Athletics Championships took place at the Olympic Stadium on 9 and 10 July. Prior to the event, Great Britain had the 2016 leading European time of 3:28.62, and they kept their form throughout the competition, setting a new leading European time in the heats and the new 2016 world leading time of 3:25.05 in the final. The team that won gold consisted of Emily Diamond, Anyika Onuora, Eilidh Doyle and Seren Bundy-Davies. The silver medal was won by France, and the bronze by Italy, both setting their season's best times.

Records

Schedule

Results

Heats
First 3 in each heat (Q) and 2 best performers (q) advance to the Final.

Final

References

Relay 4 x 400 W
4 x 400 metres relay at the European Athletics Championships
2016 in women's athletics